The 1916 Colgate football team was an American football team that represented Colgate University as an independent during the 1916 college football season. In its fifth and final season under head coach Laurence Bankart, the team compiled an 8–1 record and outscored opponents by a total of 218 to 30. Clarence Horning was the team captain. The team played its home games on Whitnall Field in Hamilton, New York.

Schedule

References

Colgate
Colgate Raiders football seasons
Colgate football